Daveyton is a township in the Ekurhuleni Metropolitan Municipality of Gauteng in South Africa. It borders Etwatwa to the north-east, Springs to the south and Benoni to the south-west. The nearest town is Benoni, which is approximately 18 kilometres away. Daveyton was established in 1952, and named after William Albert Davey, the Mayor of Benoni from 1951 to 1953. Daveyton achieved municipal status in 1983. 

Numerous civic and youth organizations operated in the township since 1980, such as the East Rand Peoples Organisation, the Daveyton Students Congress Peoples Party, the Sinaba Party, Daveyton  Peoples Party and the Daveyton Youth Council. The East Rand Peoples Party and Daveyton Students Congress were affiliates of the United Democratic Front. Chris Hani led his last March from Daveyton  to Modderbee Prison.

Culture and lifestyle

Daveyton is home to multiple musicians, radio DJs, actors and event brands. Including the likes of Lerato "Lira" Molapo, Lebo Mathosa, Victor Ndlazilwane  (Jazz Ministers),Rhoo Hlatshwayo, Percy Mtwa, Jst Sako, Young Stunna and Gauteng Music Academy.

Soccer is the most popular sporting code in the township. Therefore, multiple tournaments are held during the festive season. Namely, the Ibhola Lethu tournament at Mabuya ground, organised by the community, and the Pollen Festive Games, organised by South African soccer legend Pollen Ndlanya. It is also the birthplace of some of the country's professional soccer players, like Jabu Pule, Sbusiso Mahlangu, Junior Khanye and Clement Mazibuko, Katlego Mashego, Musa Nyatama, Xolani Mdaki, Sbusiso Mxoyana and Sbusiso Masina.

The township has garnered popularity for its vibrant nightlife and boasts a broad catalogue of pubs, taverns and lounges. Including the likes of Twotone Lounge, Brima Cafe, Xception, DKNY and Pule Chesanyama. Uzwano Embroidery and Printing remains the only embroidery service in Daveyton, serving mostly churches, schools, social clubs, stokvels/society groups as well as up and coming young entrepreneurs. Their services have resulted in the creation of successful clothing brands, namely; LXCVL (LOCAL), KOTA Gear, lepara apparels, Sho Pop, Dot Mark and many, many more other clothing brands. This has resulted in the creation of sustainable jobs in the township.

Daveyton has a golf course that has been operating for more than 19 years, funded by the world-renowned golfer, Ernie Els. Other notable establishments in the area are the Ekurhuleni Metro Police Department (EMPD) offices, the Ekurhuleni Customer Care Centre, the Daveyton and Mokoka libraries, as well as the Ekurhuleni East College, Daveyton Campus (formerly known as Isidingo College). It also boast one of the biggest arts centre in Ekurhuleni, the old brewery which was converted into an art centre.

With the approval of the Provincial Government in the 1970s, Daveyton began using vintage Chevrolet Kommando and Constantia vehicles as modes of public transportation. They are commonly called amaPhela ('cockroaches') because they were so common in the streets of Daveyton. Hence, Daveyton was dubbed the "Chevrolet Township of South Africa". Though the use of these vehicles has been superseded by the modern, fuel efficient Toyota Avanza, there are still a few classic cars in Daveyton.

It is also recognized as the home of KOTA, South Africa’s distinctive genre of street sandwiches in which a hollowed-out loaf serves as a portable, edible container for everything and anything polony, slaptjips, Russian sausages and fried eggs.

In the media
 Bopha! is a 1986 play by Percy Mtwa which was later adapted to film. The African-American filmmaker and actor Morgan Freeman directed the film, which also starred Danny Glover. The film was shot in Daveyton.
Yizo Yizo, an uncompromising television drama series, was set in Daveyton with Davey Secondary being the fictitious Supatsela High School. The show achieved record-breaking audience ratings and cult status amongst South Africa's youth. It was directed by Teboho Mahlatsi and Angus Gibson and produced by Desiree Markgraaff.
The infamous murder of Mido Macia, a Mozambican taxi driver, took place in Daveyton.

References

Townships in Gauteng
East Rand
Populated places in Ekurhuleni